is a Japanese chemist. 
He discovered the Sakurai reaction in 1976.

References

1931 births
Living people
Japanese chemists
Academic staff of Tohoku University